The 2009–10 Kentucky Wildcats men's basketball team represented the University of Kentucky during the college basketball season of 2009–10. This season was the first of John Calipari's tenure as head coach; he accepted the position on March 31, 2009.

The Wildcats set several records this season. They became the first men's college basketball program to reach 2,000 wins by defeating the Drexel Dragons on December 21. Coach Calipari set a record for the most consecutive wins for a first-year Kentucky basketball coach at 19–0, surpassing Adolph Rupp's previous mark of 11–0. Kentucky also extended their existing records for most wins all-time, SEC regular-season championships, SEC tournament championships, NCAA tournament berths, and NCAA tournament wins.

The team was briefly ranked #1 in both the ESPN/Coaches poll and AP poll, and posted the best record in the NCAA (35–3) Off the court, Coach Calipari spearheaded an effort to raise money for victims of the 2010 Haiti earthquake, yielding $1.5 million and a congratulatory call from President Barack Obama.

Departures

Class of 2009 signees

Class of 2010 signees

Roster

Depth chart

Schedule

|-
!colspan=12 style="background:#005DAA; color:white;"| Exhibition

|-
!colspan=12 style="background:#005DAA; color:white;"| Non-conference Regular Season

|-
!colspan=12 style="background:#005DAA; color:white;"| SEC Regular Season

|-
!colspan=12 style="text-align: center; background:#005DAA"|SEC Tournament
  
  

|-
!colspan=12 style="text-align: center; background:#005DAA"|NCAA tournament
  
|-

Statistics
The team posted the following statistics:

Honors

Watch Lists

Weekly Awards

SEC Awards
Wall was named SEC Player of the Year. Cousins, Patterson, and Wall were chosen to the first-team All-SEC by coaches and the media. Cousins was the SEC Freshman of the Year, and he, Bledsoe, and Wall were All-Freshman team selections by the coaches and media. Calipari was named SEC Coach of the Year by the coaches media.

National District Awards
Wall was named District IV (Kentucky, Tennessee, Mississippi, Alabama, Georgia and Florida) Player of the Year, Calipari was named District IV Coach of the Year and Patterson was named to the All-District IV team by the USBWA. Cousins and Wall were listed on the National Association of Basketball Coaches Division I All‐District 21 first team, while Patterson was listed on the second team on March 12.

All-American and National Awards
Wall was a consensus first-team All-American, and Cousins was a consensus second-team All-American. The Associated Press named Cousins and Wall as first-team All-Americans. The USBWA named Wall a first-team All-American and Cousins a second-team All-American. The NABC named Wall a first-team All-American and Cousins a second-team All-American. The Sporting News named Wall a first-team All-American and Cousins a second-team All-American. John Wall became the first Kentucky player to win a National Player of the Year award as he won the Adolph Rupp Trophy.  Wall also won the two Freshman of the Year awards as he was named USBWA National Freshman of the Year and Freshman of the Year by the Sporting News.

Rankings

2010 NBA draft

On April 7 five players announced their intentions to enter the 2010 NBA draft. Five players declared themselves eligible for the draft: Bledsoe, Cousins, Orton, Patterson, and Wall. Leading up to the draft Wall, Cousins, and Patterson were projected as lottery picks. Meanwhile, Bledsoe and Orton were projected as possible first round draft picks.

In the draft Wall was selected No. 1 by Washington. He was followed by Cousins, who went to the Sacramento Kings at No. 5; Patterson, who was taken by the Houston Rockets at No. 14; Bledsoe, who was chosen No. 18 by the Oklahoma City Thunder; and Orton, who was chosen No. 29 by the Orlando Magic. Wall became the first player in Kentucky history taken first in the draft. The five players taken in the first round tied the record for most players taken from one school in the first round.

NBA draft selections

References

Kentucky Wildcats men's basketball seasons
Kentucky
Kentucky
Kentucky Wildcats
Kentucky Wildcats